HWA or hwa may refer to:
 Hwa, a type of traditional Korean boots
 HWA (group), an American female rap group
 HWA Team, a motor racing team
 Hargeisa Water Agency
 Heartland Wrestling Association
 Hemlock woolly adelgid
 Hillwood Airways, US-based charter airline with ICAO airline designator HWA
 Horror Writers Association
 Wané language's ISO 639-3 code